Lonicera conjugialis is a species of honeysuckle known by the common name purpleflower honeysuckle. It is native to the western United States from Pacific Northwest to the Sierra Nevada, where it grows in many types of mountain habitat, especially moist areas. This is a slender shrub often exceeding 1.5 meters in erect height. The lightly hairy leaves are oval to round and 2 to 8 centimeters long. The inflorescence is generally a pair of flowers nestled in a leaf axil toward the end of a branch. Each flower is maroon red to deep purple in color. It has an upper lip made up of four fused lobes, and a single-lobed lower lip. The protruding stamens are tipped with light-colored anthers. The fruit is a pair of bright red berries which are often fused together in a double-lobed unit.

External links
Jepson Manual Profile
Photo gallery

conjugialis
Flora of the Western United States
Flora without expected TNC conservation status